Aa sphaeroglossa is a species of orchid in the genus Aa.

It is endemic to Bolivia, where it grows at altitudes of 3300 to 3800 metres.

References

sphaeroglossa
Plants described in 1922
Endemic flora of Bolivia